The following is a list of notable people from Kaunas, Lithuania.

 Valdas Adamkus, President of Lithuania 
 Aharon Amir, Israeli Hebrew poet, translator, and writer
 Moshe Arens, Israeli statesman and diplomat
 Donatas Banionis, actor
 Aharon Barak (originally Brick), professor of law at Hebrew University of Jerusalem and former President of the Supreme Court of Israel
 Antanas Baranauskas, poet, mathematician, and Catholic bishop
 Svetlana Beriosova, prima ballerina with the Royal Ballet of England
 Montague Burton, British retail magnate
 Algimantas Dailide (1921–2015), official of the Nazi-sponsored Lithuanian Security Police (Saugumas) during World War II
 Marija Gimbutienė, archaeologist
 Sara Ginaite (born 1924), former resistance fighter, now Canadian academic
 Leah Goldberg (1911–1970), Israeli poet
 Emma Goldman (1869-1940), anarchist
 Leyb Gorfinkel (1896–1976), advocate, journalist, and politician who was originally of Lithuanian and later of Israeli nationality
 Juozas Grušas, writer and editor
 Joseph Gurwin (1920–2009), American philanthropist
 Žydrūnas Ilgauskas, basketball player
 Tadas Ivanauskas, zoologist and biologist
 Valdas Ivanauskas, footballer
 Šarūnas Jasikevičius, basketball player and coach, 2005 Israeli Basketball Premier League MVP
 Romas Kalanta, student protester
 Kęstutis Kemzūra, basketball player
 Linas Kleiza, basketball player
 Albertas Vijūkas-Kojalavičius, historian, theologian, and translator
 Władysław Komar, Polish shot putter and actor
 Lazare Kopelmanas, lawyer and diplomat
 Vytautas Landsbergis, politician and member of the European Parliament
 Emmanuel Levinas, philosopher
 Aleksandras Machtas, chess player
 George Maciunas, artist, founding member of Fluxus
 Maironis, poet
 Abraham Mapu, Hebrew novelist of the Haskalah movement
 Šarūnas Marčiulionis, basketball player
 Rūta Meilutytė, swimmer
 Adam Mickiewicz, Romantic poet
 Hermann Minkowski, mathematician and one of Einstein's teachers
 Oskar Minkowski, physician and medical researcher
 Donatas Motiejūnas, basketball player
 Yitzhak Olshan, second President of the Supreme Court of Israel
 Vlado Perlemuter, pianist
 Petras Rimša, sculptor and medalist
 Vladimir Romanov, businessman, chairman of UBIG Investments
 Mykolas Romeris, lawyer and judge
 Nina Schenk von Stauffenberg, countess
 Arvydas Sabonis, basketball player
 Israel Sack, American antiques dealer
 Sidney Shachnow, US Army general
 Mykolas Sleževičius, lawyer, political figure, and journalist
 Yitzchak Elchanan Spektor, Rabbi of Kaunas and Talmudic authority
 Ladislas Starevich, stop-motion animator
 Yehezkel Streichman, Israeli painter
 Daniel Tammet, British writer
 Gintautas Umaras, retired track and road racing cyclist
 Lukas Verzbicas, American long-distance runner and triathlete
 Jonas Vileišis, lawyer, politician, and diplomat
 Edita Vilkevičiūtė, model
 Vytautas Žalakevičius, film director and writer
 Marius Žaliūkas, professional footballer
 L. L. Zamenhof, inventor of the Esperanto language

References

Kaunas